Dendy Sulistyawan (born 12 October 1996) is an Indonesian professional footballer who plays as a forward for Liga 1 club Bhayangkara and the Indonesia national team. He is also a Second Police Brigadier in the Indonesian National Police.

Club career

Persela Lamongan
Dendy made his debut for Persela Lamongan from Persela U-21. He appeared with Persela in the 2015 Piala Presiden. While still playing in the kodim tournament, he scored in every match. Dendy joined in the squad of Persela for 2016 Indonesia Soccer Championship A. Dendy made his debut in 2016 against Persegres Gresik United in the first week. In the eighth week against PS Barito Putera, Dendy scored for the first time against Barito.

Bhayangkara FC
In 2017, Dendy signed a contract with Liga 1 club Bhayangkara. He made his debut on 20 April 2017 in a match against Perseru Serui, coming as a substitutes for Thiago Furtuoso in 57th minute. On 13 July 2017, he gave assists to Alsan Sanda in Bhayangkara's 2–1 win over Madura United. On 4 August 2017, Dendy made his first league goal for the club in Liga 1, opening the scoring in a 2–1 won against Arema at the Patriot Stadium, Bekasi. Dendy scored in 21st minutes and give another assists a opening goal by Paulo Sérgio in Bhayangkara's 3–2 win over Persiba Balikpapan on 8 October 2017. During the 2017 season, he made 21 league appearances and scored 2 goals for Bhayangkara.

Persela Lamongan (loan)
On 26 July 2018, Bhayangkara manager, Sumardji, announced that Dendy with his teammates, Ambrizal and Panggih Prio Sembodho signed for Persela Lamongan to play in the Liga 1 in the half of 2018 season, on loan from Bhayangkara. He made his club debut of the season on 29 July 2018, coming as a substitutes in second half for Fahmi Al-Ayyubi and scored his first goal in second half for Persela with scored hat-trick in a 3–2 home win against Persipura Jayapura at the Surajaya Stadium, Lamongan. On 21 September, he made his first assists to Fahmi Al-Ayyubi in Persela's 3–2 away lose over PSMS Medan. On 2 November, he scored a brace for the club in a 3–0 home win against Sriwijaya, with a 3–0 victory, brought Persela to 10th place league table. a week laters, he scored the opening goal  in a 1–1 draw over Mitra Kukar. a week laters, he scored the opening goal in the first half and give another assists to Loris Arnaud in Persela's 4–0 win over Arema at Surajaya Stadium. Despite having just had a good half of the season for Persela with 16 league appearances and total scoring 9 goals in 2018 season, Dendy decided to re-join Bhayangkara because his status at the Persela was on loan to get lots of playing minutes.

Return to Bhayangkara
After his loan ended with Persela and he returned to Bhayangkara. In January 2019, Bhayangkara has finally officially announced the extension of Dendy's contract, on his Instagram account, he uploaded a photo of signing a contract with technical director Yeyen Tumena. On 22 November 2019, Dendy scored his first goal of the 2019 season in a 1–2 away win against Madura United. Dendy finished the season with only one goal in 25 league appearances, and for the 2020 season, Dendy only played 2 times for the club because the league was officially discontinued due to the COVID-19 pandemic.

On 6 November 2021, Dendy scored his first league goal of the 2021–22 season, scoring in injury time in a 2–0 win over PSM Makassar. On 18 November, he scored in a 2–1 lose over Persita Tangerang.

On 20 February 2022, He was involved in Bhayangkara's big 4–0 win over Persikabo 1973, scoring a goal in the 76th minute. On 7 March 2022, Dendy scored the decisive goal for the club's 2–1 win over PSS Sleman at the Kompyang Sujana Stadium, he was also selected as man of the match in that match. On 20 March 2022, He also involved in Bhayangkara's big 4–0 win over Persela, scoring from header in the 50th minute, the goal he scored was quite touching and so emotional for him, because he was born in Lamongan, he also had time with Persela in the 2016 season. In fact, Persela became his first team to start his professional career as a footballer. He contributed with 34 league appearances and 5 goals during with Bhayangkara for 2021–22 season.

On 24 July 2022, he started his match in the 2022–23 Liga 1 season for Bhayangkara in a 2–2  draw over Persib Bandung. His form in September saw him score two further goals in loses against Persija Jakarta (2–1), and draw against Borneo Samarinda (2–2). The number of appearances slowly increased and until recently became a main player of The Guardian. His status as a regular player at Bhayangkara made the coach of the Indonesia national team, Shin Tae-yong, call him in the FIFA Matchday against Curaçao.

On 2 February 2023, he scored in a 1–3 win over Persis Solo. Five days later, he scored from header in a 3–2 home win against Persikabo 1973 at Wibawa Mukti Stadium. On 20 February, Dendy scored the opening goal against Madura United, leading Bhayangkara to a dominant 4–0 victory at the Wibawa Mukti Stadium. And continued scored his seventh  goal of the season in a 3–1 home win against Bali United on 11 March, scored from a corner taken quickly by Matías Mier.

International career

On 24 September 2022, Dendy made his first cap for the Indonesia national team for a friendly match against Curacao in a 3-2 win. A few days later, on 27 September 2022, he scored a goal against the same opponent in a 2-1 victory. Dendy scored two goals for the national team in the 2022 AFF Championship tournament, against Brunei and Philippines.

Career statistics

Club

International

International goals

Honours

Club
Bhayangkara
 Liga 1: 2017

References

External links
 Dendy Sulistyawan at Soccerway
 Dendy Sulistyawan at Liga Indonesia

1996 births
Living people
People from Lamongan Regency
Sportspeople from East Java
Indonesian footballers
Persela Lamongan players
Bhayangkara F.C. players
Liga 1 (Indonesia) players
Association football forwards
Indonesia international footballers